Cecilia Uddén (born 28 October 1960) is a Swedish journalist, radio host and foreign reporter for Sveriges Radio. Uddén has worked as a radio foreign correspondent to the Middle East since 1993.

Early life
Cecilia Uddén was born in Hägersten, Stockholm, the oldest daughter of Per Olov Edvin Uddén and Sigrid Chatarina Öhlén-Johannsen. During her childhood, her family also spent time in Cairo, Egypt and Bangkok, Thailand. Uddén attended Norra Latins Gymnasium in Stockholm and studied philosophy at Stockholm University. She also studied journalism at Skurups folkhögskola in Skurup, Sweden. Uddén is married to Otto Manheimer, a cultural journalist and translator. The couple has two children.

Career
In 1988, Uddén started working in Sveriges Radio's culture department. Between 1993 and 1998, she was a foreign correspondent to the Middle East and was based in Cairo and Jerusalem. Between 1998 and 2003, she was the foreign correspondent to Washington for Sveriges Radio. In 2004, she began to host the radio show Konflikt which was broadcast between 2004 and 2005. She worked as a foreign correspondent based in Amman from 2006 and 2011.

After the Syrian authorities withdrew permission for her to work as a journalist,  stating that she had conveyed "false information", Uddén left Syria in December 2016. SR rejected the claims made against Uddén.

Criticism
During the 2004 American presidential election, Uddén was criticised for making an evaluative statement about one of the candidates on Sveriges Radio. The comment was seen as a breach of impartiality, leading to the suspension of Uddén from election coverage.

Uddén was criticized in December 2011, by Peter Wolodarski in Dagens Nyheter after she posed for a photo with two salafists she had interviewed.

Awards
1997: Stora Journalistpriset
2001: Sveriges Radios språkpris
2003: Jolopriset
2005: Torgny Segerstedts frihetspenna
2006: Vilhelm Moberg-priset
2010: Cordelia Edvardsonpriset
2011: Stora Journalistpriset

References

1960 births
Living people
21st-century Swedish journalists
Swedish radio personalities
Swedish women journalists
Swedish women radio presenters
Journalists from Stockholm
Stockholm University alumni
20th-century Swedish women writers